Acacia trineura, known colloquially as three-nerve wattle or three nerved wattle or green wattle, is a species of Acacia native to south eastern Australia.

Description
The slightly angular and hoary branchlets have resinous ridges and smooth grey bark. Like most species of Acacia it has phyllodes rather than true leaves. It blooms between August and October. After flowering papery and sparsely haired seed pods form that are straight and more or less flat but raised over and constricted between each of the seeds.

Taxonomy
The species was first formally described by the botanist Ferdinand von Mueller in 1863 as a part of the work Fragmenta Phytographiae Australiae. It was reclassified by Leslie Pedley in 2003 as Racosperma trineurum then returned to genus Acacia in 2006. The specific epithet is in reference to the three main veins visible in the phyllodes. It is thought to be quite closely related to Acacia redolens, a species found in Western Australia.

Distribution
It is endemic to south eastern New South Wales, northern Victoria and south eastern South Australia. In New South Wales the range of the plant is mainly between West Wyalong, Condobolin and Forbes where it is usually found growing in red earth soils as a part of mallee communities. In Victoria it is found in the Lowan Mallee, Murray Mallee and Wimmera regions where it found near water sources growing in red earth or clay soils. It is considered to be a vulnerable species in Victoria It is considered to be rare in South Australia and is confined the south eastern part of the state to the south-west of Naracoorte growing in dark coloured but shallow cracking clays.

See also
List of Acacia species

References

trineura
Fabales of Australia
Flora of New South Wales
Taxa named by Ferdinand von Mueller
Flora of Victoria (Australia)
Flora of South Australia
Plants described in 1863